Uitenhage Provincial Hospital is a Provincial government funded hospital in Uitenhage, Eastern Cape, South Africa.

The hospital departments include Emergency department, Paediatric ward, Maternity ward, Obstetrics/Gynecology, Out Patients Department, Surgical Services, Medical Services, Operating Theatre & CSSD Services, Pharmacy, Anti-Retroviral (ARV) treatment for HIV/AIDS, Post Trauma Counseling Services, X-ray Services, Physiotherapy, NHLS Laboratory, ICU & Renal Unit, Rape Crises Centre, Occupational Services, Social Workers, Laundry Services, Kitchen Services and Mortuary.

References
 Uitenhage Hospital

Hospitals in the Eastern Cape
Nelson Mandela Bay Metropolitan Municipality